Map of Salvation is a feature-length docudrama film made to commemorate the 100th anniversary of the Armenian genocide.

The film tells about five European women, Maria Jacobsen (Denmark), Karen Jeppe (Denmark), Bodil Biørn (Norway), Alma Johansson (Sweden), Anna Hedvig Büll (Estonia), who were witnesses to the Armenian Genocide and subsequently founded shelters for Armenian children and women.

Film production was in 29 cities of 9 countries.

References

External links 
 Official Website

The Demo Trailer 1
The Demo Trailer 2
The Demo Trailer 3
https://www.imdb.com/title/tt4590326/?ref_=nv_sr_srsg_0
https://www.amazon.com/Map-Salvation-Svante-Lundgren/dp/B0B6S6N84Z/ref=sr_1_1?crid=2SB0A5UOTGO4D&keywords=map+of+salvation&qid=1666089846&qu=eyJxc2MiOiIxLjUyIiwicXNhIjoiMC4wMCIsInFzcCI6IjAuMDAifQ%3D%3D&s=instant-video&sprefix=map+of+salvation%2Cinstant-video%2C258&sr=1-1

Armenian genocide films
Docudrama films
2015 drama films
2015 films
2010s English-language films